Johnny Pattillo (17 October 1914 – August 2002) was a Scottish football player and manager. He played for Aberdeen, Dundee and finally St Johnstone in 1953. He managed St Johnstone for five years, initially performing both playing and management roles.

Pattillo played during a golden era at Dens, playing right in the heart of it as a prolific striker who won two winners' medals and two runners-up medals as well as scoring a goal in the 1951 League Cup Final victory to cement his place in Dundee's history.

Born in Aberdeen in 1923, Pattillo joined his home town team in 1938 and, like so many players of his generation, had his career interrupted by the Second World War. He joined The Dons one year after their first Scottish Cup Final and left the year before they won the Cup again in 1947 but success was just around the corner for him at Dens. Before he left Pittodrie however he did finish as The Dons' top scorer and won the 1945/46 Southern League Cup against Rangers. The following summer he moved down the east coast to Dundee to join George Anderson's new look Dark Blues for £1,000.

Pattillo made his debut for The Dee on the opening day of the season in a 'B' Division match away to East Fife and was on the scoresheet in a 6–2 win. This high scoring Dark Blues' performance was a sign of things to come for the new season as they went on to score five goals or more on sixteen occasions and scored four goals eight times. His debut season saw him score twenty-two times on the way to winning the title and a further four in the Forfarshire Cup where the season ended on a high with a 5–0 home win over Dundee United in the final and Pattillo getting one of the goals.

In Dundee's first season back in the big time Pattillo scored fifteen times on the way to a very respectable fourth-placed finish. He improved that rate by two the following year as Dundee also improved their league placing by two, finishing as runners-up in the 'A' Division.

Any hopes that the runners-up spot could be improved on were dashed early the following season with a number of disappointing reverses and incredibly for Pattillo, having scored fifty-five goals in the last three seasons, he now went the whole of 1949/50 season without scoring at all as Dundee finished a disappointing sixth. They had failed to get out of their section in the League Cup and were knocked out in the first round of the Scottish Cup and so clearly something had to change the following year for Pattillo and Dundee.

What did change therefore was one of the most audacious signings in Scottish football history as Anderson persuaded superstar Billy Steel to join the Dark Blues for a world record fee of £24,000. Inside-left Steel would join inside-right Pattillo in a new dynamic forward line, alongside former Hearts centre-forward Bobby Flavell who joined shortly afterwards and it wasn't long before the trio shot Dundee to two Hampden cup final appearances in the same season.

The first of those appearances was in the League Cup Final of 1951 and Dundee's 3–2 win over Rangers is one of the best finals the National Stadium has ever seen. Pattillo scored in the 5-1 semi-final win over Motherwell at Ibrox but the real glory came for him in the final when he scored the second on sixty-nine minutes. Pattillo ran on to a Flavell through ball and shot high past Brown in the Rangers goal to put the Dark Blues 2-1 ahead.

Dundee returned to Hampden just five months later when they appeared in their second final of the season but there was no joy this time in the Scottish Cup as Motherwell took the trophy back to Lanarkshire with a 4–0 win. Pattillo played in the final and all five matches en route, scoring four times, which included a brace against Wigtown in a 7-1 second round away win and the only goal in a 1–0 victory over Berwick at Dens in the next round.

The final against Motherwell proved to be Pattillo's penultimate match for The Dee as the following week at Dens against Third Lanark in the final match of the season in the 'A' Division, Pattillo made his last appearance in dark blue, unusually at right back!

That summer he moved back to his hometown team Aberdeen to take up a coaching role but in February 1953 he was appointed manager of St Johnstone and pulled on their light blue shirt eight times to become one of the first player/managers in Scottish Football history.

Pattillo left St Johnstone in 1958 and retired from the game and died aged 79 in August 2002. In his six years at Dens he scored sixty-seven goals, making him twentieth on Dundee's all-time top goalscorers' list, putting him ahead of other high goalscorers Dens Park Tommy Coyne, Ray Stephen, Iain Ferguson, Nacho Novo, Juan Sara, Alec Stott and George Merchant.

He also did something that none of those of other goalscoring legends achieved by winning a major honour and scoring a goal in the final in the process and for that he will always be revered on Sandeman Street.

Honours at Dundee
Scottish League Cup winners: 1951/52
Scottish League Championship runners-up: 1948/49
Scottish Cup runners-up: 1952
Scottish League B Division winners: 1946/47
Appearances, Goals:
League: 123, 43 goals
Scottish Cup: 19, 10 goals
League Cup: 30, 14 goals
Totals: 172, 67 goals

References 

1914 births
2002 deaths
Footballers from Aberdeen
Scottish footballers
Association football forwards
Aberdeen F.C. players
Dundee F.C. players
St Johnstone F.C. players
Scottish Football League players
Scottish football managers
St Johnstone F.C. managers
Scottish Football League managers
Date of death missing
Place of death missing